Tyler Bowen (born July 12, 1989) is an American football coach who is the offensive coordinator and quarterbacks coach at Virginia Tech Hokies football. He previously served as the tight ends coach for the Jacksonville Jaguars of the National Football League (NFL), an assistant coach at Penn State University, University of Maryland, College Park, Fordham University and Towson University.

Early years
Bowen is a native of Helena, Georgia.

Playing career

College
From 2007 to 2009, Bowen played college football as an offensive lineman at the University of Maryland, College Park. During the 2010 season under the tutelage of head coach Ralph Friedgen and offensive coordinator James Franklin, he helped Maryland post a 9–4 record.

Coaching career

Maryland
Bowen began his coaching career at his alma mater, the University of Maryland, College Park, as a graduate assistant under head coach Randy Edsall. During his two seasons as a graduate assistant at Maryland, Bowen worked with the offensive linemen and the wide receivers.

Towson
In 2013, Bowen joined as the tight ends coach at Towson University. In Bowen's first and only season coaching at Towson, the Tigers advanced to the FCS Championship Game and finished No. 2 in the country.

Penn State
In 2014, Bowen was hired as an offensive graduate assistant at Penn State University under head coach James Franklin. Bowen spent the season primarily assisting with the offensive line.

Fordham
In 2015, Bowen joined Fordham as their offensive line coach under head coach Joe Moorhead and was promoted to offensive coordinator under head coach Andrew Breiner in 2016.

Maryland (second stint)
In 2017, Bowen returned to the University of Maryland, College Park as their offensive line coach under head coach D. J. Durkin.

Penn State (second stint)
In 2018, Bowen rejoined Penn State University as their tight ends coach and offensive recruiting coordinator under head coach James Franklin.  In his first season in coaching tight ends, true freshman Pat Freiermuth finished second among FBS tight ends with eight touchdowns. Freiermuth claimed The Athletic All-America and All-Big Ten honorable mention recognition for his efforts. In 2019, Bowen was named the interim offensive coordinator following the departure of Ricky Rahne, who left to become the head coach at Old Dominion University. In 2020, Bowen was promoted to co-offensive coordinator while retaining his roles as the offensive recruiting coordinator and tight ends coach.

Jacksonville Jaguars
On February 1, 2021, Bowen was hired by the Jacksonville Jaguars as their tight ends coach under head coach Urban Meyer.

Virginia Tech
Bowen became the offensive coordinator for Virginia Tech in 2022.  In 2022, he was also the tight ends coach. In 2023, he will become the Quarterbacks coach.

Personal life
Bowen is married to his wife, Ginny, and they have one son together. Bowen earned his bachelor's degree in communication and master’s degree in minority and urban education from the University of Maryland, College Park.

References

External links
Penn State profile
Maryland profile
Fordham profile

Living people
1989 births
Players of American football from Georgia (U.S. state)
Maryland Terrapins football players
Towson Tigers football coaches
Fordham Rams football coaches
Maryland Terrapins football coaches
Penn State Nittany Lions football coaches
People from Telfair County, Georgia
Jacksonville Jaguars coaches
Virginia Tech Hokies football coaches